Silent Valley is a 2012 Malayalam thriller film directed by Syed Usman and starring newcomers Nidheesh and Roopasree in the lead roles.

Synopsis
A group of youth plans to go for a picnic to a jungle after seeing a link in the internet. There they have to face some unexpected problems and the rest of the film unfolds the truth.

Cast
 Nidheesh as Surya
 Roopasree as Reena
 Rithi Mangal as Shabaana
 Agatha Magnus as Saathi
 Julie as Elizabeth Joseph

Production
The film was earlier titled Jungle. It was completely shot from Vagamon, Kerala.

References

2010s Malayalam-language films
2012 horror films
Indian horror thriller films
2012 horror thriller films
2012 films
2012 directorial debut films